"Love Me Till the Sun Shines" is a 1967 song by the British band The Kinks. Appearing on their album Something Else by The Kinks, it was, unlike most of the band's songs, written by guitarist Dave Davies.

Release

It was originally released as the B-side to Dave Davies' debut single, "Death of a Clown" in August 1967. The song made a further two appearances on vinyl, as an album track on The Kinks album Something Else by The Kinks in September 1967 and as a track on the "Dave Davies Hits" EP released in April 1967. The latter record was a four track compilation of Davies' first two singles.

Reception

"Love Me Till the Sun Shines" has generally received positive reception from critics.

Rolling Stone writer James Pomeroy said that "Dave is at his brutal and cynical best in 'Love Me Till the Sun Shines.'"

AllMusic critic Stewart Mason said:

The song was recorded by the Kinks twice for BBC radio, in 1967 and 1968. The 1968 version is widely considered to be the definitive reading of the song, with a much more prominent bass line from Pete Quaife. It was a regular feature of the Kinks live set from 1967 to 1969, and was later played solo by Dave Davies.

Personnel
According to band researcher Doug Hinman:

The Kinks
Dave Davies lead vocal, electric guitar
Ray Davies acoustic guitar
Pete Quaife bass
Mick Avory drums, tambourine
Unidentified (played by the Kinks) handclaps

Additional musician
Nicky Hopkins organ

References

Sources

 
 
 

The Kinks songs
British garage rock songs
1967 singles
Songs written by Dave Davies
1967 songs